Qaland-e Sofla (also Romanized as Qāland-e Soflá and Qālend-e Soflá; also known as Qālend-e Pā’īn and Qālend-e Sheykhhā) is a village in Dodangeh Rural District, in the Central District of Behbahan County, Khuzestan Province, Iran. At the 2006 census, its population was 603, in 115 families.

References 

Populated places in Behbahan County